The 2019 ICC Women's Qualifier Americas was a cricket tournament that was held in the United States in May 2019. The matches in the tournament were played as Women's Twenty20 Internationals (WT20Is), with the top team progressing to both the 2019 ICC Women's World Twenty20 Qualifier and the 2021 Women's Cricket World Cup Qualifier tournaments. The United States qualified for both tournaments, after taking an unassailable 2–0 lead, with wins in their first two matches. The United States also won the final match by 36 runs, therefore completing a 3–0 whitewash over Canada.

The qualifier was played as a best of three matches, with the fixtures played in Lauderhill, Florida. The United States named their squad on 1 April 2019, with Canada naming their squad on 9 May 2019.

Teams
The following teams competed in the tournament:

Points table

Fixtures

1st WT20I

2nd WT20I

3rd WT20I

References

External links
 Series home at ESPN Cricinfo

 
 
2019 in women's cricket
International women's cricket competitions in the United States
International cricket competitions in 2019